(), also known as ES Tunis and , is a Tunisian sports club based in Bab Souika neighbourhood of Tunis, Tunisia. The club was founded in 1919, thus being the oldest active football club in Tunisia and its traditional colours are red and yellow. They play in Hammadi Agrebi Stadium. The club is mostly known for its football team, which is currently playing in the Tunisian Professional League 1 and is one of the most popular clubs in Tunisia and is considered one of the continent's giants.

Espérance is the most successful Tunisian club; domestically, they have won 32 Tunisian Professional League 1 titles, 15 Tunisian Cup and 6 Tunisian Super Cup, all of them national records. Espérance won a total of 53 domestic trophies, more than any other Tunisian football club.

At international level, Espérance has won a total of 13 titles, with 8 organized by Confederation of African Football, including 4 CAF Champions League titles, 1 CAF Cup title, 1 CAF Cup Winners' Cup title, 1 CAF Super Cup title and one Afro-Asian Cup.

History

Founding and early years
The club was founded in Bab Souika which is one of the historic neighborhoods of the capital Tunis by Mohamed Zouaoui and Hédi Kallel as an act of resistance against the French colonization. The club was named 'Espérance' after the name of the coffeehouse where the founders used to meet each other often, the café named Café de L'Espérance.They appealed to Louis Montassier, a member of the French administration, to obtain authorization from the colonial authorities, given the regulations of the time which required that all foundations and clubs must be chaired by a Frenchman. EST is officially registered on 15 January 1919.

The first colours were green and white. In 1920, the club recruited a young high school student, Chedly Zouiten, who provided a set of jersey with vertical red and yellow bands, now becoming the club's colors. Zouiten became a member of the club's management committee in 1923 before becoming president in 1931. On 29 June 1930, Habib Bourguiba was part of the club's management committee.

Under Zouiten's tenure, which lasts more than three decades, Espérance was nearly on the verge of abandonment until promotion to the honorary division of the League of Tunisia in 1936.Espérance also manages to reach the final of the Tunisian Cup but Stade Gaulois manages to win. Three years after its failure against the Stade Gaulois, Esperance won the Tunisian Cup (1939) against the Etoile Sportive du Sahel (3–1), his first ever triumph and title. It was in 1955 that Esperance qualified to represent the Tunisian League in the North African championship. In the knockout match, two of the five teams are drawn at random to compete against each other and the winner immediately qualifies for the semi-finals. The Wydad of the Moroccan League and the Espérance Sportive de Tunis faced each other; the meeting took place in Tunis on 15 May 1955, the Tunisian club losing on the score of 2 goals to 1.

Between the start of the Second World War and independence (1956), the squad quality improved, especially since the club received the reinforcement of Algerian players like Abdelaziz Ben Tifour. The French, Italian and Maltese clubs which until then dominated football in Tunisia, had to compete with a "indigenous" club.

After the independence
When independence was proclaimed, Espérance stood out as one of the leading clubs in the country. The titles (champion in 1958 and 1960 and winner of the cup in 1957) but also the style of play, resolutely spectacular and turned towards the offensive, explain the popular enthusiasm. Attacking football was abandoned in 1963 following the passage of Ben Azzedine as coach. The latter opts for very rigorous Italian-style defensive principles.

In 1971, violent riots occurred in Stade El Menzah by Espérance supporters following the final lost against the Club Sportive Sfaxien (historic goal of Abdelwahed Trabelsi in the first minute of the game). The authorities then sanctioned Esperance and withdrew the right to play in the first division. The football section of the Espérance was dissolved while the team was one day away from being crowned as champions.

In 1977, Espérance iconic playmaker Tarak Dhiab won the African Ballon d'Or, the only Tunisian football player to have received the trophy to date.

Slim Chiboub era and national dominance (1989–2004)
Slim Chiboub, son-in-law of president Zine El Abidine Ben Ali, took charge of the club in 1989. Quickly, he kept one of his promises with a double in 1990–1991, which increased his popularity. In 1993, he won several international and local titles and signed the striker of the Zambian national team, Kenneth Malitoli. Espérance also won its first regional cup, the Arab Club Champions Cup, becoming the first Tunisian team to do so in 1993. The following year, the club won its first CAF Champions League at the expense of defending champion Zamalek. In 1995, EST won the CAF Super Cup as well as the Afro-Asian Cup, becoming the first Tunisian club win all possible continental titles. Espérance Sportive de Tunis won ten Tunisian league titles, including seven successive between 1998 and 2004 and set a new national record.

Espérance Sportive de Tunis was designated by IFFHS as the World Club of the Month for July 2004.

Hamdi Meddeb era and sustained success (2007–present)

Between 2005 and 2007, Aziz Zouhir led the club which won the double (championship and cup) in 2006. In 2007 Hamdi Meddeb took charge of the club. He focused on boosting Esperance financially and recruiting African and Tunisian talents. This is how, in a few years, Esperance signed many promising players like Michael Eneramo, Harrison Afful, Youssef Msakni, Mejdi Traoui and Yannick N'Djeng.

The 2010–2011 season was one of the most successful in the history of the club when Espérance completed a historical treble by winning the League, National Cup and the African Champions League, under coach Nabil Maâloul. Following this success, a new committee chaired by Hamdi Meddeb was elected on 25 September 2011 for a three-year term. However, Maâloul resigned after a sixth place in the FIFA Club World Cup. However, the team lost the 2012 CAF Champions League final to Al Ahly, and the team star Youssef Msakni was sold to Qatari club Lekhwiya for 23 million Tunisian Dinars.

On 6 August 2017, the club won their fourth Arab title and third Arab club championship by beating the Jordanian side Al Faisaly (3–2) after extra time. After winning its 28 league title on 8 April, Espérance won its third CAF Champions League against Al Ahly despite a defeat (3–1) on the home soil of the eight-time African champions in the first leg. In the second match, the Tunisians won with a score of 3–0, in front of a crowd of 60,000 people, with goals from Saad Bguir and Anice Badri. With the help of the young coach Moïne Chaâbani the club clinched the third Champions League in its history, a few months before its centenary on 15 January 2019. The club ends the 2018–2019 season by being crowned African champion for the fourth time after winning the CAF Champions League against Wydad  (1–1 away and 1–0 at home).

Colors and symbols

Logos throughout history

Red & Yellow
During the first year of its establishment, Esperance played in white and green: a white uniform with green with the elegance of the shirt and hands and black veil. When Dr. Chedly Zouiten came in 1920 and joined the board of directors as a general clerk, he carried with him the uniform of the school team “Football Club of Tunisia,” which he supervised before dissolving and dividing his property by his managers. Chadli Zouiten’s share was the red and yellow sports uniforms, which were better than Esperance’s uniforms. White and green, especially in the winter, to guard against the harsh cold, and he gifted them to Esperance, and since that day they have become their official uniforms and colors.

Kit manufacturers and shirt sponsors

Popular culture

Supporters

Officially, the club's fans and supporters are framed by the Espérance Sportive de Tunis, but many ultras groups have appeared alongside it that organize the club's income during major interviews. The oldest group of them is the Ultras L'Emkachkhines, which belong to the ultras movement but do not have any legal system as is the case for the European bands' lovers groups. We also find the Supras, which appeared in 2004, the Blood & Gold group appeared in 2005, Zapatista Esperanza in 2007 and Torcida in 2008, and in the same year the Matadors group appeared. In 2009 the Fedayn, Ayounos Algres and Strano Boys group appeared, and in 2010 the Los guerreros group, the Resista Armada group and others... All of these groups share the southern runways behind a guard the goal under the banner of Curva Sud. Among the acronics that some of these groups raise is A.C.A.B, which is also raised by other groups in Europe and even in Tunisia. The elderly Ultras made many incomes and carcasses and created more than 35 for them at the local level only, without counting the years of repression from 2009 to 2011 when Ultras in Tunisia were prevented from entering.

Ultras L'Emkachkhines
Ultras L'Emkachkhines, and its symbol (ULE02), is an ultras group established in 2002 by a group of fans of Espérance Sportive de Tunis.
Ultras was established in the summer of 2002, specifically on 16/08/2002, and it was the result of the idea of ​​a group of Esperance fans who love the team and were influenced by the activity of long-standing ultras groups in Europe, such as Ultras Romani and Fossa Dei Leoni.

After many consultations and discussions via the Internet, they decided to organize Their first meeting was at the Opera Café in the Cité Ennasr in the Tunisian capital, where it was agreed to establish the group under the name Ultras Giallorosso, but soon the name was changed through a proposal by one of the members to replace the word Galloroso with L'Emkachkhines for the symbolism of this word among the supporters of Esperance and to impart a spirit of belonging and identity More for the group, and the image of the warrior leader Geranimo was chosen as the group's emblem as a symbol of resistance and struggle... Ultras L'Emkachkhines had the first match and the initiation of creativity in the Esperance match against the Egyptian Zamalek in 2002.

Zapatista Esperanza
Zapatista Esperanza, the ultras group that supports Espérance Sportive de Tunis, was founded in 2007 and its symbol is (ZE07) and with its word (siamo solo noi).

The name comes from the Zapatista National Liberation Army (Ejército Zapatista de Liberación Nacional, EZLN) is an armed revolutionary group from the state of Chiapas in southern Mexico. The movement consists mainly of the indigenous people of the region. The movement takes the name Emiliano Zapata - one of the leaders of the Mexican Revolution of 1910.

Accidents

Tragedy of 13 June 1971
The tragedy of 13 June 1971, when the red and yellow lost the Tunisian Cup final against CS Sfaxien at Stade El Menzah, and from it a spark of a conflict with the security erupted behind several human and material losses to order the Minister of Interior and Sports at that time to dissolve the team until President Habib Bourguiba returned to bring him back to the sports arena.

The events of 8 April 2010
Espérance lived several stations that its sons considered as a struggle, such as the events of 8 April 2010 against the security, which witnessed several wounded and arrested as a result of unprecedented clashes with the security in a famous match in which the lights of El Menzah stadium went out in a match between Espérance and CS Hammam-Lif that ended in a 3–3 draw.

Infrastructure

Stadiums

Stade Hammadi Agrebi

Stade Olympique Hamadi Agrebi, opened as Stade 7 November, is a multi-purpose stadium in Radès, Tunis, Tunisia about 10 kilometers south-east of downtown Tunis, in the center of the Olympic City. It is currently used mostly for football matches and it also has facilities for athletics.  The stadium has a capacity of up to 60,000 spectators and was built in 2001 for the 2001 Mediterranean Games. The stadium and is considered to be one of the best stadiums in Africa.

It was inaugurated in July 2001 for the final of the Tunisian Cup between CS Hammam-Lif and Étoile du Sahel (1–0).

Stade El Menzah

Stade El Menzah is a multi-purpose stadium, located in the north of Tunis, Tunisia.

It is built to host the 1967 Mediterranean Games at the same time as the Olympic swimming pool and gymnasium. Since then, it is an integral part of Tunisia's main sports complex. Tunisia's three major football teams, Espérance de Tunis, Club Africain and Stade Tunisien played their games there.

The stadium was completely renovated for the 1994 African Cup of Nations. It has a capacity of 45,000 seats. The VIP section consists of a grandstand and 2 salons that can accommodate 300 people in a "cocktail" configuration. The stadium hosted the matches of Tunisia national football team until the inauguration of the Stade 7 November in the south of Tunis in 2001.

Honours

Official honors

 
  shared record

Club prizes
African Inter-Club Team of the Year: 2011
FIFA Fair Play Award: 2019

Individual Awards

Players Awards
African Footballer of the Year
 1977:  Tarak Dhiab

Tunisian Athlete of the Year Award
 1977:  Tarak Dhiab
 1989:  Khaled Ben Yahia
 2000:  Chokri El Ouaer

Tunisian Golden Boot
 1981:  Khaled Ben Yahia
 1982:  Tarak Dhiab
 1987:  Khaled Ben Yahia

Tunisian Golden Ball
 2009:  Oussama Darragi
 2012:  Moez Ben Cherifia
 2013:  Youssef Msakni

African Inter-Club Player of the Year (Based in Africa)
 2011:  Oussama Darragi
 2019:  Youcef Belaïli

Arab Golden Ball
 2012:  Oussama Darragi

Best Maghreb Player Award
 2018:  Anice Badri

Competition topscorers
Tunisian Ligue Professionnelle 1 goalscorer
 1959:  Abdelmajid Tlemçani
 1960:  Abdelmajid Tlemçani
 1962:  Chedly Laaouini
 1975:  Zoubeir Boughnia
 1982:  Riadh El Fahem
 1988:  Nabil Maâloul
 1993:  Kenneth Malitoli
 1994:  Kenneth Malitoli
 1997:  Sami Laaroussi
 1998:  Ziad Tlemçani
 2000:  Ali Zitouni
 2002:  Kandia Traoré
 2006:  Amine Ltifi
 2009:  Michael Eneramo
 2010:  Michael Eneramo
 2012:  Youssef Msakni
 2013:  Haythem Jouini
 2017:  Taha Yassine Khenissi
 2019:  Taha Yassine Khenissi
 2022:  Mohamed Ali Ben Hammouda

CAF Champions League goalscorer
 2010:  Michael Eneramo
 2014:  Haythem Jouini
 2017:  Taha Yassine Khenissi
 2018:  Anice Badri

FIFA Club World Cup goalscorer
 2019:  Hamdou Elhouni

International participations

FIFA Club World Cup

African Cup of Champions Clubs and CAF Champions League

CAF Confederation Cup

CAF Cup

African Cup Winners' Cup

CAF Super Cup

Afro-Asian Club Championship

Twinning
 Taraji Wadi Al-Nes (Palestinian Club)

Rival clubs
  Club Africain (Derby)
  ES Sahel (Rivalry)
  CS Sfax (Rivalry)
  Al Ahly SC (Rivalry)
  Zamalek SC (Rivalry)
  Wydad AC (Rivalry)
  CR Belouizdad (Rivalry)

Presidents

 Mohamed Melki (1919–1923)
 Chedly Zouiten (1924)
 Mohamed Zouaoui (1925)
 Mustapha Kaak (1926–1930)
 Chedly Zouiten (1930–1963)
 Mohamed Ben Ismaïl (1963–1968)
 Ali Zouaoui (1968–1971)
 Hassen Belkhodja (1971–1981)
 Naceur Knani (1981–1984)
 Abdelhamid Achour (1984–1985)
 Moncef Zouhir (1985–1986)
 Mondher Znaïdi (1986–1987)
 Hedi Jilani (1987–1989)
 Slim Chiboub (1989–2004)
 Aziz Zouhir (2004–2007)
 Hamdi Meddeb (2007–present)

Source: www.est.org.tn

Managers

 Hammadi Ben Ghachem (1938–1939)
 Hachemi Cherif (1942–1959)
 Habib Draoua (1959–1961)
 Hachemi Cherif (1961–1962)
 Jean Baratte (1962–1963)
 Abderrahmane Ben Ezzedine (1963–1966)
 Sandor Pazmandy (1966–November 1968)
 Robert Domergue (November 1968–May 1969)
 Abderrahmane Ben Ezzedine (May 1969 – 1971)
 Slah Guiza (September 1971–November 1971)
 Vladimír Mirka (November 1971 – 1973)
 Hmid Dhib (1973–May 1976)
 Abderrahmane Ben Ezzedine (May 1976–July 1976)
 Stjepan Bobek (1976–1978)
 Mokhtar Tlili (1978–1981)
 Hmid Dhib (1981–1982)
 Mrad Mahjoub (1982–December 1983)
 Roger Lemerre (December 1983 – 1984)
 Amarildo Tavares da Silveira (1984–1987)
 Antoni Piechniczek (1987–1990)
 Władysław Żmuda (1990–1991)
 Andon Dončevski (1991–1992)
 Zdzisław Podedworny (1992–1993)
 Faouzi Benzarti (1993–1996)
 Luigi Maifredi (1996)
 Khaled Ben Yahia (1996–1997)
 Youssef Zouaoui (1997–2002)
 Michel Decastel (2002–2004)
 Claude Andrey (2004–2005)
 Khaled Ben Yahia (2005–2006)
 Jacky Duguépéroux (2006–2007)
 Faouzi Benzarti (2007)
 Larbi Zouaoui (July 2007–August 2007)
 Carlos Cabral (September 2007–December 2007)
 Youssef Zouaoui (December 2007–May 2008)
 Carlos Cabral (May 2008–November 2008)
 José Morais (November 2008–March 2009)
 Faouzi Benzarti (March 2009–November 2010)
 Maher Kanzari (November 2010–December 2010)
 Nabil Maaloul (December 2010–January 2012)
 Michel Decastel (January 2012–May 2012)
 Nabil Maaloul (May 2012–February 2013)
 Maher Kanzari (February 2013–October 2013)
 Sébastien Desabre (December 2013–January 2014)
 Ruud Krol (January 2014–May 2014)
 Sébastien Desabre (May 2014–August 2014)
 Khaled Ben Yahia (August 2014–February 2015)
 José Morais (February 2015–June 2015)
 José Anigo (June 2015–August 2015)
 Ammar Souayah (August 2015–January 2017)
 Faouzi Benzarti (January 2017–December 2017)
 Mondher Kebaier (January 2018–February 2018)
 Khaled Ben Yahia (February 2018–October 2018)
 Mouine Chaabani (October 2018–July 2021)
 Radhi Jaïdi (August 2021–June 2022)
 Nabil Maâloul (June 2022–present)

Source: www.est.org.tn

Players

Current technical staff

Notes

References

External links
e-s-tunis.com
www.sofascore.com
Espérance Sportive de Tunis at FIFA.com

 
Football clubs in Tunisia
Football clubs in Tunis
Association football clubs established in 1919
Multi-sport clubs in Tunisia
1919 establishments in Tunisia
Sports clubs in Tunisia
CAF Champions League winning clubs
CAF Cup winning clubs
African Cup Winners Cup winning clubs
CAF Super Cup winning clubs